Khoirao also known as Thangal is a Sino-Tibetan language spoken in India.

Geographical distribution
Khoirao is spoken in the East and West Sadar hills subdivisions, Senapati district, northern Manipur, in the villages of Mapao Thangal, Thangal Surung, Makeng Thangal, Tumnoupokpi, Yaikangpou, Tikhulen, Ningthoubam, Mayangkhang, and Angkailongdi. Most villages located are east of the Barak valley.

References

Languages of Assam
Languages of Manipur
Zeme languages
Endangered languages of India